Mullaghdubh (pronounced Mullaghhdoo and  meaning Dark Hill) is a townland in Islandmagee, County Antrim, Northern Ireland. 

The local Mullaghdubh Primary School and Kilcoan Primary School amalgamated to form Islandmagee Primary school.

References

Townlands of County Antrim